Mount Chōtō is a mountain,  high, surmounting the northern end of the Langhovde Hills on the coast of Queen Maud Land, Antarctica. It was mapped by Norwegian cartographers from air photos taken by the Lars Christensen Expedition, 1936–37. It was surveyed by the Japanese Antarctic Research Expedition, 1957–62, and named "Chōtō-san" (mount long head) in association with the name Langhovde Hills.

References
 

Mountains of Queen Maud Land
Prince Harald Coast